Theroor is a panchayat town in Kanniyakumari district in the Indian state of Tamil Nadu.

Demographics
 India census, Theroor had a population of 100000. Males constitute 50% of the population and females 50%. Theroor has an average literacy rate of 86%, higher than the national average of 59.5%: male literacy is 89%, and female literacy is 83%. In Theroor, 8% of the population is under 6 years of age.

References

Cities and towns in Kanyakumari district